Anti Saar (born May 9, 1980) is a contemporary Estonian children’s writer and translator.

Saar graduated from the University of Tartu in semiotics.

Bibliography 

 Kuidas meil asjad käivad (The Way Things Are With Us), Tänapäev 2013
 Kojamees Urmas (Urmas the Maintenance Man), Päike ja Pilv 2015
 Juturaamat (Storybook), Tänapäev 2016
 Pärt ei oska saltot (Pärt Can't Do a Backflip), Päike ja Pilv 2017
 Külaskäik (The Visit), Päike ja Pilv 2017
 Seisa siin, Pärt! (Stand Here, Pärt!), Päike ja Pilv 2018
 Pärt ja viimane koogitükk (Pärt and the Last Piece of Cake), Päike ja Pilv 2018
 Mina, Milda ja meister Michel (Milda, Master Michel, and I), Eesti Kunstimuuseum 2018
 Pärt ja ploomid (Pärt and Plums), Päike ja Pilv 2018
 Pärt läheb uuele ringile (Pärt Goes Full Circle), Päike ja Pilv 2019

Awards 

 2013 Estonian Children's Literature Centre Raisin of the Year Award (The Way Things Are With Us)
 2013 Good Children's Book (The Way Things Are With Us)
 2013 Annual Children's Literature Award of the Cultural Endowment of Estonia (The Way Things Are With Us)
 2014 The White Ravens (The Way Things Are With Us)
 2015 Good Children's Book (Urmas the Maintenance Man)
 2017 Good Children's Book (The Visit)
 2017 "Järje Hoidja" Award of the Tallinn Central Library (Pärt Can't Do a Backflip)
 2018 Good Children's Book (Stand Here, Pärt!)
 2018 Estonian Children's Literature Centre Raisin of the Year Award (Milda, Master Michel, and I)

Translations 

Hungarian

 Így mennek nálunk a dolgok, Cser 2018

Polish

 Ja, Jonasz i cała reszta, Wydawnictwo Widnokrąg 2018

Latvian

 Tā iet mūsu lietas, Liels un mazs 2017

Russian

 Как у нас идут дела, Издательство «КПД» 2017

Italian

 Una piccola grande invenzione, Sinnos 2017

References

External links 
 Estland | Anti Saar und Alvar Jaakson: Wie die Dinge bei uns so laufen. VivaVostok, Internationale Jugendbibliothek 2016 
 Pärt and the Last Piece of Cake. Book Review by Tiina Undrits in Estonian Literary Magazine 1/2019

Living people
1980 births
Estonian translators
Estonian children's writers
21st-century Estonian writers
University of Tartu alumni
Hugo Treffner Gymnasium alumni
21st-century translators
Estonian male writers
21st-century male writers